Tŷ Newydd is a historic house in Llanystumdwy, near Criccieth, in Gwynedd, north-west Wales. Since 1990 it has housed the National Writing Centre of Wales. The centre specialises in residential creative writing and retreats. The courses are in both the English and Welsh languages, and cover many genres, forms and styles. The centre also holds regular seminars and forums.

House 
The Grade II* listed building was built in the fifteenth century. The name Tŷ Newydd translates literally from Welsh as 'New House'. The house has six bedrooms, a large dining room, a kitchen, a conservatory and two libraries. The outbuilding, Hafoty, is the tutors' quarters, and has six extra rooms for guests.  Other architectural features of the house include a "Chinese Chippendale" balustrade, a panelled front door with fluted pilasters and a frieze, and a vaulted ceiling in the library.

David Lloyd George, the Welsh politician who served as British Prime Minister during the First World War, owned Tŷ Newydd from 1942 until his death in 1945. He had asked for his bed to be moved to the library, and died in that room.

The grounds overlook Cardigan Bay and provide a scenic setting considered conducive to literary creativity. During the 1940s these were restyled by the architect Sir Clough Williams-Ellis.

Lloyd George period
David Lloyd George (17 January 1863 – 26 March 1945) was a British Liberal politician and statesman, and Prime Minister of the Wartime Coalition Government (1916–22). Lloyd George grew up in Llanystumdwy in Caernarfonshire. As a child, he was educated in the local Anglican school, Llanystumdwy National School. Tŷ Newydd was originally a farm, whose land extended to the road adjacent to Lloyd George's other home, Brynawelon. Brynawelon was later the home of his daughter Megan.  In 1942, Lloyd George and his wife Frances bought Tŷ Newydd and initiated a major renovation by the architect Clough Williams-Ellis (28 May 1883 – 9 April 1978). Under his direction, new additions such as the library window and the front window finals were made. Like the rest of the house, the library extension was built of local stone rubble and externally whitewashed. In 1944 the couple moved into Tŷ Newydd. Lloyd George died in 1945, aged 82, and was buried beside the River Dwyfor in Llanystumdwy, only a short distance from the house. A monument designed by Williams-Ellis was erected around the grave. This bears an englyn (a strict-metre stanza in the Welsh language) engraved on slate in his memory, composed by his nephew Dr William George, an accomplished poet who won the crown at the National Eisteddfod in 1974.

As a writers' centre 
Robert Minhinnick, who, with Gillian Clarke, was a tutor on the first course run at the house after it was converted to a writers' centre, credits Sally Baker with the idea for the project. During work carried out in preparation for the opening of the centre, a medieval "post and panel" screen was discovered; it is considered the most historically significant feature of the house.

References

External links

 
 Literature Wales site
 David Lloyd George Exhibition, National Library of Wales

Welsh literature
Welsh-language literature
Education in Wales
Grade II* listed houses in Wales
Llanystumdwy
David Lloyd George
Prime ministerial homes in the United Kingdom
Houses in Gwynedd
Grade II* listed buildings in Gwynedd